Princess Tutu was originally broadcast in two seasons. The first season, "Kapitel des Eies" ("Chapter of the Egg"), consisted of 13 half-hour episodes. The second season was broadcast as 24 quarter-hour episodes and one half hour episode, to conform to the format of the time slot,  so that each episode was split into two parts. These were brought back together in the DVD release as 13 complete episodes. The second season is called "Kapitel des Jungens" ("Chapter of the Chick") in R2 DVDs, and "Kapitel (sic) des Kükens" ("Chapter of the Fledgling") in R1 DVDs.

In 2004, ADV Films announced that they had licensed the anime series for distribution in North America. ADV Films produced English adaptations for all episodes and, beginning in 2005, the series was periodically released as single DVD "volumes" that each contained several episodes. In 2007, the series was released as a complete DVD collection of all 26 episodes. In 2011, AEsir Holdings announced the licensing of the series and the release of a complete DVD collection of all 26 episodes distributed by Section23 Films.

Episode list

Season 1 (TV)

Season 2 (TV)

Music themes
Both the opening theme, "Morning Grace", and the ending theme, "Although My Love Is Small", are sung by Ritsuko Okazaki. Throughout the series, a classical style pervades the soundtrack, which includes recordings of such classical composers as Pyotr Ilyich Tchaikovsky, Johann Strauss II, and Erik Satie.

See also 
 List of Princess Tutu characters

References

External links
 Princess Tutu (TV) episode titles at Anime News Network's Encyclopedia
 Watch Anime Network shows—Princess Tutu

Episodes
Princess Tutu